Kreyer is a surname.  It can refer to the following people:

 Frank Kreyer (b.1970), US racecar driver
 Georgij Karlovich Kreyer (1887-1942), Russian botanist and mycologist
  (1890–1949), British brigadier
  (b.1956), German politician
  (b.1952), German former Formula One engineer
 Robin Kreyer (1910-1987), English cricketer and soldier
  (b.1973), German linguist
 Scott Kreyer, original member of Canadian rock band Toronto
 Sven Kreyer (b.1991), German footballer 
 Vitold Kreyer (b.1932), Russian retired triple jumper

Surnames